Tsuneko (written: 恒子 or つね子) is a feminine Japanese given name. Notable people with the name include:

, Japanese swimmer
, Japanese nurse
, pen-name of Nakazato Tsune, Japanese writer
, Japanese scientist
, Japanese photographer
Tsuneko Taniuchi, Japanese performance artist

Japanese feminine given names